Amt Dahme/Mark is an Amt ("collective municipality") in the district of Teltow-Fläming, in Brandenburg, Germany. Its seat is in Dahme.

The Amt Dahme/Mark consists of the following municipalities:
Dahme
Dahmetal
Ihlow
Niederer Fläming

Demography

References

Dahme
Teltow-Fläming